Ryan Van Dyke (born February 13, 1980) is a former American football quarterback who played two seasons in the Arena Football League (AFL) with the Los Angeles Avengers and Grand Rapids Rampage. He played college football at Michigan State University and attended Marshall High School in Marshall, Michigan. He was also a member of the Seattle Seahawks, New York Giants and Cologne Centurions.

Early years
Van Dyke played high school football for the Marshall High School Redskins (since renamed to Redhawks). He earned first-team all-state honors, completed 118 of 182 pass attempts for 1,996 yards and 25 touchdowns as a senior. He helped the then-Redskins to a 12-1 record in 1997 and a second-place finish in the state playoffs, after winning the state championship his junior season. Van Dyke added 300 yards rushing and scored seven touchdowns in 1997.

College career
Van Dyke played for the Michigan State Spartans from 1998 to 2001. He recorded fourteen touchdowns on 2,111 passing yards for the Spartans.

Professional career
Van Dyke signed with the Seattle Seahawks of the National Football League (NFL) on April 22, 2002 after going undrafted in the 2002 NFL Draft. He was released by the Seahawks on August 26, 2002. He signed with the NFL's New York Giants on January 7, 2003. Van Dyke was released by the Giants on August 25, 2003. He was signed by the Giants on January 13, 2004 and allocated to NFL Europe to play for the Cologne Centurions. He was released by the Giants on September 5, 2004. Van Dyke signed with the Los Angeles Avengers of the AFL on November 1, 2004. He was released by the Avengers on February 14, 2006. On February 28, 2006, he was signed to the practice squad of the Grand Rapids Rampage of the AFL. Van Dyke was promoted to the active roster on March 8, 2006.

References

External links
Just Sports Stats
College stats

Living people
1980 births
American football quarterbacks
Michigan State Spartans football players
Seattle Seahawks players
New York Giants players
Cologne Centurions (NFL Europe) players
Los Angeles Avengers players
Grand Rapids Rampage players
Players of American football from Michigan
People from Marshall, Michigan